Baker Creek or Bakers Creek may refer to:

Australia
 Bakers Creek, Queensland
 Bakers Creek air crash
 Bakers Creek (New South Wales), a minor tributary of the Manning River

Canada
 Baker Creek (Alberta), a stream in Alberta
 Baker Creek, British Columbia

United States
 Baker Creek (Alaska), a creek in the Rampart region of the Yukon–Koyukuk Census Area
 Baker Creek (Georgia), a creek in west-central Georgia, east of Columbus
 Baker Creek (Little Miami River), a stream in Ohio
 Baker Creek (Montana), a stream in Flathead County, Montana
 Bakers Creek, also Jericho Creek (Delaware River tributary), a tributary of the Delaware River in Pennsylvania
 Baker Creek State Park, South Carolina
 Baker Creek Falls (Yamhill County, Oregon), a waterfall near the Oregon Coast